Hiran Manuel Gonçalves da Silva (born 5 May 1968) is a Brazilian politician as well as a physician and ophthalmologist. Although born in Amazonas, he has spent his political career representing Roraima, having served as state representative since 2015.

Personal life
Gonçalves married to Gerlane Baccarin with whom he has five children and two grandchildren. Gonçalves is a physician prior to entering politics, and has also worked as an ophthalmologist and is a member of the American Academy of Ophthalmology. Gonçalves moved with his family from Amazonas to Roraima in 1982, he worked as a medical examiner at the Instituto Médico Legal (IML) in Roraima from 1982 to 2007. He has served briefly as a health inspector to prevent cancer and sexual abuse in the Northwest states of Brazil.

Political career
Gonçalves was initially a member of Party of National Mobilization shortly before running for office switched to the Progressive Party.

Gonçalves voted in favor of the impeachment against then-president Dilma Rousseff. Gonçalves voted in favor of the Brazil labor reform (2017), and would later back Rousseff's successor Michel Temer against a similar impeachment motion.

References

External links
 

1968 births
Brazilian ophthalmologists
Living people
Members of the Chamber of Deputies (Brazil) from Roraima
People from Amazonas (Brazilian state)
Progressistas politicians

Party of the Brazilian Woman politicians
Party of National Mobilization politicians
Humanist Party of Solidarity politicians
Social Labour Party politicians